Perry's Ice Cream is an ice cream manufacturer located in Akron, New York. Perry's sells and distributes primarily to New York, Western Pennsylvania, New England, and Northeast Ohio.

History
Perry's Ice Cream was founded in 1918 by H. Morton Perry as Perry's Dairy, a dairy delivery business. The business would later supply ice cream to Akron High School starting in 1932. In 1940 H. Morton Perry and his son, Marlo, were able to purchase a Buffalo ice cream maker and expanded their distribution into Akron.

Thomas C. Perry, Marlo's son, became CEO and president of the company in 1982, and chairman of the board in 1988, after his father died.

In 1997 the company released the flavor "Zero Visibility" to commemorate the 20th anniversary of the Blizzard of 1977.

As of 2000, the company's CEO and president is Robert Denning, Thomas C. Perry's son-in-law.

In 2016 the company exceeded $100 million in revenue for the first time.

In 2018 Perry's celebrated its 100th anniversary. To celebrate, it re-released four retro flavors. The company recorded $100 million in sales for the year. 

In 2019 the company launched Perry's Oats Cream, an oat milk based product line. That same year, it expanded distribution to North Carolina.

Present day 
As of 2022 the company had 370 employees. It is family-owned and operated by the fourth generation of the family. 

The company claims to have over 130 flavors of ice cream, sherbet, and frozen yogurt. The company has partnered with several sports teams, including the Buffalo Bills, Buffalo Sabres, Cleveland Guardians, and Columbus Blue Jackets, to produce novelty ice cream flavors. Nearly all milk used by the company comes from dairy farms in western New York.

Awards 

 2019: Plant of the Year, Dairy Food Magazine

External links

References

Manufacturing companies based in New York (state)
1918 establishments in New York (state)
Ice cream brands